Kalateh-ye Reza may refer to:
 Kalateh-ye Reza, North Khorasan

See also
 Kalateh-ye Reza Khan